The 230s decade ran from January 1, 230, to December 31, 239.

Significant people

References